The 1973 Akron Zips football team represented Akron University in the 1973 NCAA Division II football season as an independent. Led by first-year head coach Jim Dennison, the Zips played their home games at the Rubber Bowl in Akron, Ohio. They finished the season with a record of 6–5 and outscored their opponents 289–203.

Schedule

References

Akron
Akron Zips football seasons
Akron Zips football